"Love on Arrival" is a song written and recorded by American country music singer Dan Seals.  It was released in January 1990 as the lead-off single from his album On Arrival.  The song spent three weeks at No. 1 on Billboard Hot Country Singles & Tracks chart that April, making it the longest-running chart-topper of his career.

Content
A 1950s-style rock 'n' roll tune with a prominent saxophone, the singer and his girlfriend communicate using common abbreviations, such as PDQ, TGIF (although here, it means "Thank God I found" you) and TLC. The other abbreviation is "LOA," which is short for the title lyric ("love on arrival"), which the girlfriend promises to her long-absent beau once he arrives home.

Chart positions

Year-end charts

Cover Versions
Bluegrass group Doyle Lawson & Quicksilver covered the song on their 2011 album, Drive Time.

References

1990 singles
Dan Seals songs
Songs written by Dan Seals
Song recordings produced by Kyle Lehning
Capitol Records Nashville singles
1990 songs